The James H. and Anne B. Willis House is a historic house at 707 Blair Street in Greensboro, North Carolina.  It is a single story Modernist structure, laid out in a T shape with a gabled roof.  The north facade, facing Blair Street, has a large plate glass window, while the main entrance is on the shorter west side, sheltered by a shed-roof porch.  The exterior has a variety of finishes, including vertical cypress board and brick veneer, and plate glass windows and smaller sash windows are used in variety around the exterior.  The house was built in 1965, and is an important Modernist work of the local architectural firm of Loewenstein-Atkinson.

The house was listed on the National Register of Historic Places in 2015.

See also
National Register of Historic Places listings in Guilford County, North Carolina

References

Houses on the National Register of Historic Places in North Carolina
Houses completed in 1965
Houses in Greensboro, North Carolina
National Register of Historic Places in Guilford County, North Carolina